Feel It may refer to:

 Feel It (Fat Larry's Band album), 1976
 Feel It (Some Girls album), 2003 
 "Feel It" (DJ Felli Fel song), 2009 
 "Feel It" (The Tamperer featuring Maya song), 1998
 "Feel It" (Three 6 Mafia song), 2009 
 "Feel It", a 1961 single by Sam Cooke
 "Feel It", a Black Eyed Peas song from the album Monkey Business
 "Feel It", a Kate Bush song from the album The Kick Inside
 "Feel It", a Neneh Cherry song from the album Man
 "Feel It", a song by Killarmy from the album Fear, Love & War
 "Feel It", a TobyMac song from the album ***THIS IS NOT A TEST***
 "Feel It" ("Shout It Out Remix"), a theme song from The Wendy Williams Show performed by Fergie
 "I Feel It", a song by Moby from the double A-side "I Feel It/Thousand"